Rudolf Rössler (1864–1934) was an Austrian painter and illustrator.

Life 
Rudolf Rössler was born in Gablonz, Bohemia (then part of Austria-Hungary), on 28 April 1864. He was known as a painter of genre scenes. He taught at the Vienna College of Applied Arts. He died in Vienna on 16 October 1934, aged seventy.

Gallery

References

Sources 

 Beyer, Andreas; Savoy, Bénédicte; Tegethoff, Wolf, eds. (2021). "Rößler, Rudolf". In Allgemeines Künstlerlexikon - Internationale Künstlerdatenbank - Online. K. G. Saur. Retrieved 8 October 2022.
 Boetticher, Friedrich von (1898). "Rössler, Rudolf". In Malerwerke des Neunzehnten Jahrhunderts. Beitrag zur Kunstgeschichte. Vol. 2. Dresden: Fr. v. Boetticher's Verlag. pp. 473–474.
 Vollmer, Hans, ed. (1934). "Rössler, Rudolf". In Allgemeines Lexikon der Bildenden Künstler von der Antike bis zur Gegenwart. Vol. 28. Leipzig: E. A. Seemann. p. 503.
 "Rössler, Rudolf". Benezit Dictionary of Artists. 2011. Oxford Art Online. Retrieved 8 October 2022.

1864 births
1934 deaths
19th-century Austrian painters
20th-century Austrian painters
Austrian illustrators